Seyl Mish-e Olya (also Romanized as Seyl Mīsh-e ‘Olyā; also known as Seyl Mīsh and Sīlmish) is a village in Robat Rural District, in the Central District of Khorramabad County, Lorestan Province, Iran. At the 2006 census, its population was 12, in 4 families.

References 

Towns and villages in Khorramabad County